There are at least four schools named Washington Irving Middle School:
Washington Irving Middle School (West Virginia) in Clarksburg, West Virginia.
Washington Irving Middle School (Los Angeles) in Los Angeles, California.
Washington Irving Middle School (Roslindale) in Roslindale, Massachusetts, near Boston.
Washington Irving Middle School (Springfield) in Springfield, Virginia.

There is one school named using the term "intermediate":
Washington Irving Intermediate School (Tarrytown) in Tarrytown, New York, near White Plains.

There is also one school that uses the term "academy":
Washington Irving Academy (Texas) in San Antonio, Texas

See also
 Washington Irving High School (disambiguation)

Washington Irving